Umberto Silvestri (6 September 1915 – 28 May 2009) was an Italian wrestler. He competed at the 1936 Summer Olympics, the 1948 Summer Olympics and the 1952 Summer Olympics.

Filmography

References

1915 births
2009 deaths
Italian male sport wrestlers
Olympic wrestlers of Italy
Wrestlers at the 1936 Summer Olympics
Wrestlers at the 1948 Summer Olympics
Wrestlers at the 1952 Summer Olympics
Sportspeople from Rome
20th-century Italian people